Chrysocetus (from Greek chrysous, "golden", and ketos, "whale", in reference to the gold-colored bones of the type specimen) is a genus of extinct early whale known from Late Eocene-aged fossils of the eastern United States and western Africa.

Taxonomy
The type species, Chrysocetus healyorum, is based on a single subadult specimen from the late middle or early late Eocene of Orangeburg County, South Carolina (paleocoordinates ). The holotype, SCSM 87.195, consists of a partial skull with lower jaws, ten teeth, and the hyoid apparatus; 21 vertebrae, some ribs and a sternum; a partial left forelimb; and partial innominates.

A second species, Chrysocetus fouadassii, is known from Bartonian-age deposits in the Western Sahara.

Description
Chrysocetus is similar to Zygorhiza except that it lacks the denticles on the cingula of the upper premolars characteristic of Zygorhiza.  The premolars of Chrysocetus have smoother enamel than other dorudontines and are more gracile than those of Dorudon.

Notes

References
 

Basilosauridae
Prehistoric cetacean genera
Eocene mammals of Africa
Eocene mammals of North America
Eocene United States
Fossil taxa described in 2001